A long black is a style of coffee commonly found in Australia and New Zealand. It is similar to an Americano, but with a stronger aroma and taste.

A long black is made by pouring a double-shot of espresso or ristretto over hot water. Typically about 100–120 milliliters (3.5–4 ounces) of water is used but the measurement is considered to be flexible to individual taste. The smaller volume of water compared to an Americano is responsible for its stronger taste. Both retain the crema when brewed properly, though in the long black the crema will be more pronounced.

See also

 Caffè Americano
 Espresso (short black)
 Flat white
 List of coffee drinks
 Lungo - espresso made by allowing more water than usual to pass through the grounds

References 

Coffee in Australia
Coffee in New Zealand
Espresso drinks
Australian drinks